Eupithecia helenaria is a moth in the  family Geometridae. It is found in Brazil.

References

Moths described in 1906
helenaria
Moths of South America